The Rose Garden Center, or the Tyler Municipal Rose Garden, is a historic, municipal garden of roses in Tyler, Texas. It is the largest collection of roses in the United States. It is one of the largest tourist attractions in Tyler, it is the location of the Tyler Rose Museum, and is part of the annual Texas Rose Festival.

The Rose Garden Center is listed on the National Register of Historic Places since March 22, 2019, for its role in regional and state tourism.

History 

The Rose Garden Center was a 1938 Works Progress Administration (WPA) park project, and was mostly completed in 1941; but due to World War II, the center did not opened to the public until 1952. In 1956, the lawn at the Rose Garden Center started hosting the Queen's Tea event, a part of the annual Texas Rose Festival. In 1992, they rebuilt the associated building and expanded its size, in order to home the Tyler Rose Museum.

It is 14-acre rose garden with more than 38,000 bushes and at least 500 varieties, including 50 types of heritage roses. It is the largest public collection of roses in the United States. It is also an All-America Rose Selections (AARS) test garden.

It is one of the largest tourist attractions in Tyler, it is the location of the Tyler Rose Museum, and is part of the annual Texas Rose Festival in October. In 2022, the center added QR codes near the plants in order to facilitate identifying roses varieties.

See also 

 National Register of Historic Places listings in Smith County, Texas

References

External links 
 

National Register of Historic Places in Smith County, Texas
Buildings and structures completed in 1952
Rose gardens in the United States
Tourist attractions in Smith County, Texas
History of Tyler, Texas
Parks on the National Register of Historic Places in Texas
Gardens in Texas